August Gottschalk (Essen, 14 December 1921 – Essen, 27 November 2014) was a German footballer who played as a forward.

Biography 
He debuted professionally in 1939 with Rot-Weiss Essen. In his first stint with the club, he played for six seasons. He left the club in 1945 to play for a year for Preußen Essen. At the end of the 1945/1946 season, he returned to the Rot-Weiss Essen, where he played for another nine seasons. In this second stint with Rot-Weiss Essen he scored 99 goals in 186 matches. He was captain of the team when it won the DFB-Pokal in 1953 and Bundesliga championship in 1955.

References 

1921 births
2014 deaths
German footballers
Rot-Weiss Essen players
Footballers from Essen
Association football forwards
West German footballers